Surendra Raj Pandey is a Nepalese politician belonging to Nepali Congress and the former Leader of the Opposition in the National Assembly. He is also the Central Working Committee member of Nepali Congress.

References 

21st-century Nepalese politicians

Year of birth missing (living people)
Living people
Nepali Congress politicians from Gandaki Province
Members of the National Assembly (Nepal)